Kaiser is a Thoroughbred racehorse who won the New Zealand Derby in 1979. He was trained by Neville Atkins and ridden in the 1979 Derby by Alwin Tweedie.

Like Ruling Lad, who won the race the following year, Kaiser was a son of Ruling, who himself was a son of Bold Ruler.

His Derby winning time, 2:29.42, was at the time the second-fastest in the history of the race.

1975 racehorse births
Racehorses bred in New Zealand
Racehorses trained in New Zealand
Thoroughbred family 11